, is a Japanese pharmaceutical company, specializing in ophthalmology. With its ophthalmic products Santen holds the top share within the Japanese market and is one of the leading ophthalmic companies worldwide, with its products being sold in over 50 countries.

The company was founded in 1890 by Kenkichi Taguchi, as Taguchi Santendo, and in 1925, Santendo Co., Ltd. was established. In 2014 Santen announced that it has entered into an agreement with Merck & Co. to purchase Merck's ophthalmology products.

Business locations
Santen has 3 plants located in Hōdatsushimizu, Ishikawa, in Tampere and in Suzhou, 21 subsidiary companies located in Japan, the US, the Netherlands, Finland, United Kingdom & Ireland, Spain, Switzerland, Italy, France, Germany, Sweden, China, South Korea, Taiwan, India, Thailand, Malaysia, the Philippines and Singapore. Its R&D center is located in Ikoma, Nara.

References

External links
Official global website 

Pharmaceutical companies of Japan
Manufacturing companies based in Osaka
Pharmaceutical companies established in 1890
Japanese companies established in 1890
Companies listed on the Tokyo Stock Exchange
Companies listed on the Osaka Exchange
Japanese brands